Michael Averett Lowell (born February 24, 1974) is an American former Major League Baseball third baseman. During a 13-year career, Lowell played for the New York Yankees (1998), Florida Marlins (1999–2005), and the Boston Red Sox (2006–2010). With the Red Sox, he was named MVP of the  World Series.

Personal life
Lowell was born in Puerto Rico to Carl and Beatriz Lowell on February 24, 1974. His parents were born in Cuba, and are of Irish and Spanish ancestry. His family relocated to Miami, Florida, when Lowell was four years old. He has always identified himself as both Cuban and Puerto Rican. He attended elementary school at Epiphany Catholic School in South Miami, Florida. As a high school sophomore at Christopher Columbus High School, he was selected to the varsity baseball team but did not get playing time, so he transferred to Coral Gables Senior High School for his junior year.

In 1992, Lowell graduated from Coral Gables Senior High School in Coral Gables, Florida, where he had a 4.0 GPA and was a star player on the baseball team. There, he met future wife Bertica, a member of the school's nationally recognized Gablettes dance team, of which she became coach years later. They have one daughter, Alexis Ileana Lowell, and one son named Anthony.  In 2006, Lowell's sister, Cecilia, married Carlos Curbelo, who was a United States Congressman from 2015–2019.

Lowell's autobiography, Deep Drive: A Long Journey to Finding the Champion Within, was published on May 6, 2008. On February 19, 1999, Lowell was diagnosed with testicular cancer, causing him to miss nearly two months of the 1999 season while he underwent treatment for the disease. However, he later recovered and went on to play baseball professionally. The Lowell family currently resides in Pinecrest, Florida.

Florida International University
Lowell was awarded an athletic scholarship to attend Florida International University (FIU) to play college baseball for the FIU Panthers baseball team. In 1993 he played in the Valley Baseball League a collegiate summer baseball league in the Shenandoah Valley region of Virginia for the Waynesboro Generals. In the summer of 1994, he played for the Chatham A's in the Cape Cod Baseball League (CCBL). Lowell was a league all-star for Chatham, and was inducted into the CCBL Hall of Fame in 2011. Lowell graduated from FIU in 1997 with a Bachelor's Degree in Finance.

A three-time All Conference player with the Panthers, his uniform number 15 was retired. Lowell was drafted by the New York Yankees in the 1995 Major League Baseball draft, and eventually made his MLB debut with the New York Yankees during the 1998 season. He was also converted to play as a third baseman, having been at shortstop and second base in college.

Major League Baseball

New York Yankees
Lowell was drafted by the New York Yankees in the 20th round of the 1995 Major League Baseball draft. He made his major league debut as a September call-up for the Yankees in 1998, singling in his first at-bat and playing eight games in the season.

Although Lowell debuted late in the season and did not play in the 1998 postseason, he still received his first career World Series ring as the Yankees won the 1998 World Series against the San Diego Padres.

Florida Marlins
Lowell was traded to the Florida Marlins on February 1, 1999, for Mark Johnson and Ed Yarnall. While waiting for spring training, he discovered that he had testicular cancer and underwent surgery on February 21 returning to the lineup on May 29. He finished his season with a .253 batting average, 12 home runs, and 47 RBI.

Lowell had successful years in Florida and established himself as one of the elite third baseman in the league. In , he finished with 18 home runs and 100 RBI.

He was replaced by Miguel Cabrera.

In , he hit a career-high (at the time) .293 with 27 home runs and 85 RBI. Despite a disappointing 2005 season in which he hit .236 with only eight home runs and a .298 on-base percentage, Lowell earned his first Gold Glove Award. Lowell also finished third in doubles in the league, totaling 47 doubles in the 2005 season.

The Marlins traded him to Boston in a deal that was officially completed on November 21, 2005, in which the Red Sox received Lowell, Josh Beckett and Guillermo Mota in exchange for Hanley Ramírez, Aníbal Sánchez, Jesús Delgado and Harvey García.

Boston Red Sox

Although the Boston Red Sox took on Lowell and his contract largely because the Marlins would not trade pitcher Josh Beckett without relieving themselves of Lowell's salary, Lowell fared better than expected as a member of the 2006 Red Sox, for a time leading the league in doubles and providing solid defense at third base. Lowell finished with 20 home runs and 80 RBI, and he was tied with Eric Chavez for the best fielding percentage at his position.

The  season turned out to be one of Lowell's best, in which he set career bests in hits, RBI, batting average, OPS, and played a key role in helping the Red Sox win their second World Series in four years. One of the early highlights of the season came on April 22 when Lowell was one of the four Red Sox players to hit consecutive home runs against the Yankees. During the first half, Lowell hit .300 and led the team with 14 home runs (tied with David Ortiz) and 63 RBI. This performance helped earn him a spot on the 2007 American League All-Star Team as a reserve player voted in on the player's ballot.

As the Red Sox held onto its lead in the American League East division, Lowell continued to carry the team by hitting .350 during the second half. Lowell also finished with a .324 batting average, 21 home runs and 191 hits, another career high.

During the 2007 World Series, Lowell hit .400 with one home run, 4 RBI, six runs scored and a stolen base in the four-game sweep against the Colorado Rockies. Lowell got his third World Series ring and was named the World Series MVP. He also became the second Puerto Rican player to be named the MVP of a World Series (the first one being Roberto Clemente). Lowell along with fellow ex-Marlin Josh Beckett became the first duo to each get a World Series MVP by winning a World Series with one team in the American League and the other in the National League.

Following the season, Lowell placed fifth in the American League Most Valuable Player voting. Although he filed for free agency, Lowell returned to the Red Sox after signing a three-year contract worth $37.5 million.

Lowell had trouble with a torn hip labrum that required surgery between the 2008 and 2009 seasons. As a result, he spent several stints on the disabled list. The injury caused him to miss most of the 2008 playoffs, including the ALCS when the Red Sox lost to the Tampa Bay Rays. It also kept him from representing Puerto Rico in the 2009 World Baseball Classic. He did return to action with the Red Sox in 2009, though he saw reduced playing time at third base in order to keep him healthy and in playing condition. After the Red Sox acquired Victor Martinez in a midseason trade with the Cleveland Indians, Lowell's playing time was reduced, casting his future with the team into doubt. After the season, it was speculated that the Red Sox would attempt to trade Lowell.

Following the 2009 season, the Red Sox and Texas Rangers agreed to a deal that would send Lowell to Texas for catcher Max Ramírez. However, the deal was called off by the Rangers when they discovered that Lowell required surgery on his right thumb. Lowell underwent a successful surgery on December 30. He remained with the Red Sox and joined the team for spring training following rehabilitation on his surgically repaired thumb. On April 10, 2010, Lowell announced that he would most likely retire after the 2010 season. In the 2010 season, he played as a backup infielder at first and third base and as a pinch hitter. On August 3, after coming back from nearly two months on the disabled list, Lowell stepped into the batter's box to a standing ovation at Fenway Park and hit a two-run home run on the first pitch. On May 3, 2010, Lowell had his eighth career three-double game, setting an all-time record for the most by a player in a career.

On October 2, 2010, the Boston Red Sox honored Lowell with an on-field ceremony as he would go on to retire after the 2010 Major League Baseball season was complete.

Post-career
Lowell works as an analyst on the MLB Network, appearing on MLB Tonight.

He appeared on the ballot for the National Baseball Hall of Fame and Museum 2016 election and earned no votes.

Accolades
2× World Series champion ;()
 World Series MVP
4× All-Star (2002–04, 2007)
Tony Conigliaro Award winner (1999)
NL Gold Glove Third Baseman (2005)
TYIB Defensive Player of the Year (2006)
Jackie Jensen Award (2006)
Holds the Red Sox franchise single-season record for most RBIs by a third baseman (2007)

See also

List of Puerto Ricans
Irish immigration to Puerto Rico
List of Major League Baseball career home run leaders

References

External links

1974 births
Living people
National League All-Stars
American League All-Stars
Boston Red Sox players
Florida Marlins players
Gold Glove Award winners
Major League Baseball third basemen
World Series Most Valuable Player Award winners
MLB Network personalities
Oneonta Yankees players
Columbus Clippers players
New York Yankees players
Pawtucket Red Sox players
FIU Panthers baseball players
Chatham Anglers players
Major League Baseball players from Puerto Rico
Sportspeople from San Juan, Puerto Rico
Puerto Rican people of Irish descent
Puerto Rican people of Cuban descent
Sportspeople from Coral Gables, Florida
Sportspeople from the Miami metropolitan area
Silver Slugger Award winners
Coral Gables Senior High School alumni